Waltteri Ruuskanen (born July 23, 1997) is a Finnish professional ice hockey defenceman who is currently a free agent having last played for SaPKo of Mestis.

Ruuskanen began his career with KalPa, playing in their junior teams before making his Liiga debut with the team during 2015–16 season. He went on to play seven games in Liiga with the team before joined SaPKo in 2017. During the 2017–18 season, Ruuskanen played six games for Lahti Pelicans on loan.

References

External links

1997 births
Living people
Finnish ice hockey defencemen
Iisalmen Peli-Karhut players
KalPa players
Lahti Pelicans players
People from Kuopio
SaPKo players
Sportspeople from North Savo